"B'coz I Love You" is a song by Hitomi Yaida, released as her first single after signing distribution contracts with Toshiba EMI.

It reached number 16 in the Oricon charts and remains a fan favourite at her live performances.

Track listing

Other appearances
"B'coz I Love You" appeared in the arcade video games Drummania 4th Mix and GuitarFreaks 5th Mix.

Personnel
Hitomi Yaida - Music and Writing
Diamond Head - Backing and Production
Murata Akira - Keyboards and Programming
Susumu Nishikawa - Electric and Acoustic Guitars and Bass on "B'coz I Love You"
Takashi Saito - Electric Bass on "Stay" and "Ne"
Katsumi Usui - Drums and percussion on "B'cos I Love You" and "Nē"

Notes and references

External links
 Jpop Stop Wiki! on B'Coz I Love You

2000 singles
Hitomi Yaida songs
2000 songs
Songs written by Hitomi Yaida